Rhodacarellus is a genus of mites in the family Rhodacaridae. There are at least 20 described species in Rhodacarellus.

Species
These 21 species belong to the genus Rhodacarellus:

 Rhodacarellus apophyseus Karg, 1971
 Rhodacarellus arcanus (Athias-Henriot, 1961)
 Rhodacarellus citri Fouly, 1992
 Rhodacarellus corniculatus Willmann, 1935
 Rhodacarellus epigynialis Sheals, 1956
 Rhodacarellus francescae Athias-Henriot, 1961
 Rhodacarellus iraniensis Castilho, Jalaeian & de Moraes, 2012
 Rhodacarellus kreuzi Karg, 1965
 Rhodacarellus liuzhiyingi Ma, 1995
 Rhodacarellus maxidactylus Karg, 2000
 Rhodacarellus moneli Solomon, 1978
 Rhodacarellus montanus Shcherbak, 1980
 Rhodacarellus perspicuus Halašková, 1959
 Rhodacarellus shandongensis Ma, 2008
 Rhodacarellus silesiacus Willmann, 1936
 Rhodacarellus subterraneus Willmann, 1935
 Rhodacarellus tadchikistanicus Shcherbak, 1980
 Rhodacarellus tebeenus Hafez & Nasr, 1979
 Rhodacarellus unicus Karg, 2000
 Rhodacarellus vervacti (Athias-Henriot, 1961)
 Rhodacarellus yalujiangensis Ma, 2003

References

Rhodacaridae